Dera Allah Yar railway station (Balochi: ڈیرہ اللہ یار ریلوے اسٹیشن), formerly known as Jhatpat railway station, is located in Dera Allah Yar city, Jaffarabad district of Balochistan province, Pakistan.

See also
 List of railway stations in Pakistan
 Pakistan Railways

References

Railway stations in Jafarabad District
Railway stations on Rohri–Chaman Railway Line